The melodious lark (Mirafra cheniana) is a species of lark in the family Alaudidae found in southern Africa. It is currently threatened by habitat loss.

Taxonomy and systematics
The alternate name of singing bush lark usually refers to the species of that name, Mirafra cantillans. Other alternate names for the melodious lark include: Latakoo lark, Latakoo bush lark, melodious bushlark, singing bush lark, Southern lark, Southern singing bush lark and Southern singing lark.

Distribution and habitat 
At times, local populations will abandon one area for another when the regular dry-season fires occur.

Habitat 
The natural habitat of the melodious lark is subtropical or tropical, seasonally wet or flooded, lowland grassland. Within these regions, it prefers the drier slopes, especially in open runs between grassy tussocks.

Melodious larks select different textures of grass or grass parts to build their domed, obliquely-accessed nests. They use the harder and more fibrous grasses and stalks for an outer thatch, while the finer and softer grasses or grass leaves are used to line the nest's interior.

Behaviour and ecology

Breeding 
The melodious lark is assessed as likely to be both territorial and monogamous, and lays a clutch of 2-4 eggs. It is generally resident, breeding from September to March. The level of breeding activity varies depending on locality. The most active period in South Africa is between November and January, while in Zimbabwe it is from January to March.

Food and feeding 
The melodious lark forages on the ground for food, eating mostly grass seeds supplemented with insects.

References

External links

 Melodious lark - Species text in The Atlas of Southern African Birds.

melodious lark
Birds of Southern Africa
melodious lark
Taxonomy articles created by Polbot